Ormond is a suburb in Melbourne, Victoria, Australia, 12 km south-east of Melbourne's Central Business District, located within the City of Glen Eira local government area. Ormond recorded a population of 8,328 at the 2021 census.

Ormond's postcode is 3204 south of Leila Road and 3163 north of Leila Road. It is bordered by Tucker Road on the eastern side, Koornang Road on the northern side, Thomas Street on the western side and Murray Road and Blackshaw Street on the southern side.

The suburb is named after pastoralist, politician and philanthropist Francis Ormond.

History

An Ormond Post Office opened on 1 January 1870 and closed in 1884. It reopened in 1907. Ormond East Post Office was open from 1951 until 1981.

In 1905, Abraham Lewis begun operations of a timber mill in the then market garden estates of Ormond (formerly East Brighton) as the surrounding subdivision began to grow. Furthermore, in the early 1930-40's the Lewis family purchased a larger piece of land neighbouring market gardens on the corner of Jasper Road and Jasper Street. At this site, A. Lewis & Company PTY LTD was built and continues to this day in the same family ownership and operations.

In the mid-1900s the council changed the street name to Lewis Street to avoid confusion between the main road and side street being both named Jasper as those in the area simply referred to the street as "the one Lewis's is on". In the 1980s Laurence Lewis (Jr) donated Box Cottage from the recently acquired Reitman's concreting works which neighboured the property to the Moorabbin Historical Society and was removed piece by piece; it was then rebuilt in Joyce Park with timber donated from the timber mill operations to original specification.

Originally supplying the surrounding estates builders with timber skirting, architraves and framing materials, many of which can still be purchased in the exact style original to the design hand shaped by Abraham Lewis. The business still manufactures the same mouldings of timber by Abraham's descendants with three of the five generations currently assisting in all areas of the business.

Today

Port Phillip Bay glimpses are possible from some of the elevated homes in the south-west corner of the suburb, with the bay itself being about 4 km away. Ormond contains numerous churches and parks, including E.E Gunn reserve, home to the Ormond Amateur Football Club, Ormond Tennis Club, Ormond Cricket Club and Ormond-Glen Huntly Baseball Club. The suburb is also home to Kilvington Grammar School, a private school located in Leila Road, and the Wilsonian Institute, a relatively unknown research facility.

The Ormond shopping strip is located primarily on North Road, and has declined since its heyday in the middle of last century, as North Road carries large volumes of traffic. It is home to an impressive array of restaurants however, with upwards of 10 different cuisine styles on offer. This variety reflects the multiculturalism of Melbourne.

The original housing stock of Ormond was generally constructed between 1890 and 1950, with some minor infill occurring after that time. Californian bungalow-style houses are common, and many "dog box" cream brick apartment buildings were constructed in the 1960s. The last 15 years has seen a rise in property prices in Ormond, with higher quality developments becoming common, including numerous modern three-storey apartment buildings in and around the shopping strip in North Road.

The suburb is serviced by the Ormond railway station, on the frequent Frankston line.

Education
 Ormond Primary School
 St Kevin's Primary School (closed end 2020 due to dwindling enrolment)
 McKinnon Primary School
 Kilvington Grammar School

Notable people

Notable people from or who have lived in Ormond include:
 Igor and Olga Machlak, a piano duo

See also
 City of Caulfield – Parts of Ormond were previously within this former local government area.
 City of Moorabbin – Parts of Ormond were previously within this former local government area.

References

Suburbs of Melbourne
Suburbs of the City of Glen Eira